Pennsylvania elected its members October 13, 1818.

See also 
 1818 Pennsylvania's 4th congressional district special election
 1818 Pennsylvania's 6th congressional district special elections
 1818 and 1819 United States House of Representatives elections
 List of United States representatives from Pennsylvania

Notes

References 

1818
Pennsylvania
United States House of Representatives